Webster Farm is a historic farmhouse in Cross Bridges, Tennessee, USA.

History
The two-storey farmhouse was completed circa 1826. It was designed in the Federal architectural style.

Architectural significance
It has been listed on the National Register of Historic Places since July 19, 1996.

References

Farms on the National Register of Historic Places in Tennessee
Federal architecture in Tennessee
Buildings and structures completed in 1826
Houses in Maury County, Tennessee
National Register of Historic Places in Maury County, Tennessee
Historic districts on the National Register of Historic Places in Tennessee